Olaf Berner (born 31 August 1949 in Itzehoe) is a German teacher and former team handball player.

Olaf Berner is member of THW Kiel since the early 1960s. He left the club two times for playing with the TSV Altenholz at the Handball-Bundesliga, but both times he returned to the THW. From 1976 to 1978 he played for the THW at the Handball-Bundesliga. During the 1977/78 season he was the captain of the Zebras.

Berner is geography and sports teacher. He is married and has two children.

Since July 2012  Olaf Berner is president of the THW Kiel.

References

External links 
 profile

1949 births
Living people
German male handball players
People from Itzehoe
Sportspeople from Schleswig-Holstein